School District 64 Gulf Islands is a school district in British Columbia. It includes the islands off southern Vancouver Island in the Strait of Georgia. This includes Saltspring Island as well as Galiano, Mayne, Saturna, Pender Islands. It also recently went through a reconfiguration causing the outer island kids grade 8 and up to go to Pender for 3 years and then to Saltspring.

History
One of the earliest school districts was established on Salt Spring Island. The Salt Spring Island School District was created in 1869 in the Colony of Vancouver Island prior to the island colony joining mainland British Columbia.

Schools

See also
List of school districts in British Columbia

External links

64